Bornholmsk is an East Danish dialect spoken on the island of Bornholm in the Baltic Sea. It was originally part of the East Danish dialect continuum, which includes the dialects of southern Sweden, but became isolated in the Danish dialect landscape after 1658, when Sweden annexed the eastern Danish provinces of Scania/ Skåne, Halland and Blekinge.

The language is more generally spoken than written, despite the existence of several Bornholmsk–Danish dictionaries and a regular Bornholmsk article in the local newspaper. Even words that are never used in Standard Danish are spelled according to the standard orthography.

The dialect is endangered, as the inhabitants of Bornholm have been shifting to standard Danish over the past century. "Bevar Bornholmsk" is an organization whose purpose is to preserve Bornholmsk. Its main organization is KulturBornholm, the editor of books with CDs with the text in Bornholmsk.

Dialects 
The small island has only about 40,000 inhabitants, yet the language is divided into five main dialects, not counting standard Danish. As an example, "eye" would be spelled  in some regions, but elsewhere it would be , which is quite close to the Danish word  and Scanian "öja-öjen".

The northern part of the island would have more influence by Swedish than the rest of the island, due to the relatively large number of Swedish immigrants on those shores closest to Sweden. The differences are actually large enough so that the north-Bornholm dialect is called  ("Allinge-Swedish") in Danish –  in Bornholmsk. However, most Swedish immigrants hailed from the Scanian provinces and spoke dialects that derived from East Danish.

Danish or Swedish?

Like in the case of the closely related Scanian dialect spoken in Southern Sweden, the question whether the dialect is Danish or Swedish cannot be separated from the political and ideological burden attached to language as an ethnic marker. Therefore, Danes from other parts of the country may accuse people from Bornholm of speaking Swedish as a kind of insult (using derogatory nicknames like reservesvensker, "auxiliary Swede").

From a linguistic point of view, the Scandinavian languages form a continuum, and the dialects of Skåne, Blekinge, Halland and Bornholm are a natural bridge between "sjællandsk" (the dialects of Zealand) and "götamål" (the dialects of Götaland). One may define "Danish" and Swedish" in two different ways:
 historically: Danish is the part of the dialect continuum that has certain sound changes in common like the weakening of plosives (see below) or certain innovations in the vocabulary.
 sociolinguistically: Danish is the part of the dialect continuum that has Standard Danish as its written standard (Dachsprache).
According to both criteria, Bornholmsk is indeed a Danish dialect (whereas modern Scanian would be Swedish according to the second one, although this was not so until 1680 when Swedish first became the language of the authorities and church in Scania).

Bornholmsk has indeed many phonetical features in common with Swedish (most of them archaisms, though, which are irrelevant for the classification of the dialect). Yet, in most cases where the vocabularies of Swedish and Danish differ, Bornholmsk stands with Danish. This is also reflected in its IETF BCP 47 language tag, da-bornholm.

Phonology

Sound system
An official standardised orthography of Bornholmsk does not exist since Standard Danish is taught in schools and is the language of all public communication. However, dialect texts use a simplified phonetical alphabet (invented by K.J. Lyngby in the 19th century and also employed in Espersen's dictionary of Bornholmsk):

A stressed syllable always contains either a long vowel or a long consonant (like in Swedish, but unlike Standard Danish, where there are no long consonants). Bornholmsk does not have the stød characteristic of most varieties of Danish, but on the other hand, it does not have the musical accent characteristic of Swedish and Norwegian either.

Phonetic development 
In the list, there is special emphasis on the developments that set Bornholmsk apart from Standard Danish. For the sake of convenience, Old Norse (i.e. Old Icelandic) forms have been quoted instead of Old Danish forms.
 postvocalic p > v : kaupa "buy" > kjøvva  (SD købe , colloquial and in most dialects )
 postvocalic f > w or, seldom, v: grafa > grawa  (SD grave ), lefa "live" > lewa  (SD leve )
 w > v, but w after s, k: vatn "water" > vann  (SD vand ), but sverja "swear" > swæra  (SD sværge ), kvenna "woman" > kwinnja  (SD kvinde ).
 postvocalic t >  d . In some words, we have , though, and increasingly so due to the influence from Standard Danish: bīta "bite" > bida  (SD bide ).
 postvocalic ð > -, sometimes (especially in unstressed syllables and learned words) ð: nauð "need" > nö  (SD nød ), but mánaðr "month" > månad (SD måned )
 postvocalic k > g after back-tongue-vowels. ēk, ek, ik, īk > æj or (before t, s) aj: kaka "cake" > kâga  (SD kage ); eik "oak" > æj  (SD eg ), lík "corpse" > læj  (SD lig ), seks "six" > sajs  (SD seks )
 postvocalic g > w after back-tongue vowels and j after front-tongue vowels: fogl > fâwl  (SD fugl ), lagr "low" > lâwer  (SD lav ), segja "say" > saja  (SD sige ), vegr "way" > vaj  (SD vej )
 k, g > kj, dj  before and after front-tongue vowels. tj and sj > kj  and sj : keyra "run (a car)" > kjöra  (SD køre ), gess "geese" > gjæss  (SD gæs ), fekk "got" > fikj  (SD fik ), egg "egg" > ægj  (SD æg ).
 nn > nnj  and nd > nn or (after i, y, u) nnj : þynnr "thin" > tynnjer  (SD tynd ), binda "bind" > binnja  (SD binde ), but land "land" > lann  (SD land ).
 ll, ld > llj : oll "wool" > ullj  (SD uld ), kaldr "cold" > kålljer  (SD kold )
 ŋ > nnj  after e and sometimes i, y: lengi > lænnje  (SD længe ), þenkja, þenkti "think, thought" > tænjkja, tænjte  (SD tænke, tænkte )
 iū > y or, word-initially and after t, jy: ljós "light" > lyz  (SD lys ), jól "Christmas" > jyl  (SD jul ), þjórr "bull" > kjyr  (SD tyr )
 y, ø > i, e, æ before w: daufr "deaf" > dæwer  (SD døv ), tjogu "twenty" > tjuge > kjive  (SD tyve )
 unstressed a > a (like Swedish, but unlike the other Danish dialects): kalla "call" > kalja  (SD kalde ), sumarr "summer" >  såmmar  (SD sommer )
 long ō is preserved in closed syllables: bóndi "farmer" > bone  (SD bonde ), similarly hús > hōs "at (somebody)" > hos  (SD hos )
 ow, ōw, uw, ūw > âw : dúfa "dove" > dâwwa  (SD due ), skógr > skâww  (SD skov ), sofa "sleep" > sâwwa  (SD sove )

Morphology

Nominal inflection

Bornholmsk has retained three distinct grammatical genders, like Icelandic or Norwegian, and unlike standard Danish or Swedish. The gender inflection exists not only in the definite article (like in Norwegian and certain Danish dialects), but also in the adjectives:

-er is the old ending of the masculine nominative still extant in German (-er), Icelandic (-ur) and Faroese (-ur), but lost in the other Scandinavian dialects (except for certain old phrases like Danish en ungersvend, originally en unger svend, "a young fellow"). In Bornholmsk, it is used in all cases (since the dialect has not retained the Old Danish case flexion).

Masculine nouns normally have the plural ending -a - and this is also the case when the singular ends in a vowel (where Standard Danish would have -er), e.g. skâwwa "woods" (sg. skâww), tima "hours" (sg. tima). Feminine nouns have -er or, when they end in a vowel in the singular, -ar. Neuter nouns have zero ending, and the definite article of the neuter plural is -en, e.g. huz "houses", huzen "the houses" (sg. huz)

Pronouns

Bornholmsk has an enclitic form of the personal pronoun that is unknown in the other Danish dialects, namely masculine -iń "him" and feminine -na "her". They originate from the old accusatives hann and hana still used in Icelandic, whereas the Scandinavian languages, apart from spoken Swedish in the Mälaren Valley, normally use the old dative form for the oblique case (Danish ham, hende, Swedish honom, henne). These enclitic forms also occur in spoken Norwegian, where -n is masculine and -a is feminine. Colloquial and dialectal Swedish has them as well: jag har sett'n/sett'na "I have seen him/her".

Verbal conjugation 
Until the 20th century, Bornholmsk inflected the verbs in number, e.g. jâ bińńer "I bind" ~ vi bińńa "we bind", jâ bânt "I bound" ~ vi bonne "we bound". Spoken Danish gave up this inflection in the 18th century already, even though it was still practiced in the literary language until it was officially cancelled in 1900 (jeg binder ~ vi binde).

Bornholmsk also has special endings for the 2nd person, when a pronoun follows immediately after the ending, namely -st in the singular and -en in the plural:
 såstu-na "did you see her" (SD så du hende)
 gån i "are you going" (SD går I)
 varren så goa "here you are" (SD vær så god, værsgo; lit. "be so good/kind")

Text samples

Literature
Beginning of a poem printed in Espersen's Bornholmsk Ordbog.

Spoken language

Interview with a native speaker from Ibsker. The informant was born in 1906, and the text was recorded in 1973.:

Notes

References 
 John Dyneley Prince, "The Danish Dialect of Bornholm",  Proceedings of the American Philosophical Society, Vol. 63, No. 2 (1924), pp. 190–207.
 J.C.S. Espersen, Bornholmsk Ordbog, 1905.
 Niels Åge Nielsen, Dansk dialektantologi, 1978, vol. 2, pp. 15–18.
 Leon Strømberg Derczynski & Alex Speed Kjeldsen, Bornholmsk Natural Language Processing: Resources and Tools, Proceedings of the Nordic Conference on Computational Linguistics, 2019.

Danish dialects
Bornholm